Verticordia huegelii var. huegelii, commonly known as variegated featherflower, is a flowering plant in the myrtle family, Myrtaceae and is endemic to the south-west of Western Australia. It is an upright, slender or bushy shrub, with creamish-white flowers turning pink or reddish maroon as they age, giving the plant a variegated appearance. It is similar to Verticordia huegelii var. decumbens but is more upright than that variety and lacks a lignotuber.

Description

The staminodes are lance-shaped to egg-shaped, tapering towards the tip which is fringed with a few hairs. Flowering time is mostly from September to November.

Some forms of this variety have flowers with a white style and yellow stigma when they open, while others have a red stigma with red hairs and a third type has a pale yellow stigma.

Taxonomy and naming
The species, Verticordia huegelii was first formally described by Stephan Endlicher in 1837 and the description was published in Enumeratio plantarum quas in Novae Hollandiae ora austro-occidentali ad fluvium Cygnorum et in sinu Regis Georgii collegit Carolus Liber Baro de Hügel. In 1991, Alex George undertook a review of the genus and described four varieties of Verticordia huegelii, including this one.

Distribution and habitat
This variety of V. huegelii grows in sand, clay and loam, often with granite, laterite or sandstone sometimes in areas that are wet in winter but also on hillsides, often with other species of verticordia. It occurs from near Geraldton south to near Dwellingup and to a few nearby inland areas in the Avon Wheatbelt, Geraldton Sandplains, Jarrah Forest and Swan Coastal Plain biogeographic regions.

Conservation
Verticordia huegelii var. huegelii is classified as "not threatened" by the Western Australian Government Department of Parks and Wildlife.

Use in horticulture
It is usually propagated from cuttings, grows best in full sun and is usually hardy in a range of soils and climates as long as the soil is well-drained. The soil surface needs to be kept clear of organic matter to prevent problems with fungal infections.

References

huegelii var. huegelii
Rosids of Western Australia
Eudicots of Western Australia
Plants described in 1837